Agustina Quinteros (born September 24, 1990) is an Argentine model and beauty pageant titleholder who represented Argentina at Miss World 2008 in South Africa. She also crowned Miss Tourism Ibero-America 2009 (the first edition), in the city of Las Termas de Río Hondo, Argentina.

Early life
She was born in Santa Rosa, Argentina in 1990.

Career
She trained as a model and was employed in a number of fashion shows in 2008. Other work areas have included appearances in Television commercials and on poster advertising campaigns. At 17 years old she became beauty queen of La Pampa. At Rio Hondo (Santiago del Estero) she entered a competition between 24 of the most beautiful women in Argentina, she went on to win and was chosen to represent her country as Miss Internacional Argentina.

References

External links

1990 births
Living people
People from Santa Rosa, La Pampa
Miss World 2008 delegates
Argentine beauty pageant winners